In music theory and music criticism, eclecticism refers to the use of diverse styles, either distinct from the background of an artist using them, or from culturally bygone eras and movements. The term can be used to describe the music of composers who combine multiple styles of composition; an example would be a composer using a whole tone scale variant of a folk song in a pentatonic scale over a chromatic counterpoint, or a tertian arpeggiating melody over quartal or secundal harmonies. Eclecticism can also occur through quotations, whether of a style, direct quotations of folk songs/variations of them—for example, in Mahler's Symphony No. 1—or direct quotations of other composers, for example in Berio's Sinfonia.

See also
Polystylism
Progressive music

Notes

References

Sources
 
 

Music genres
Musical techniques